Psalm 139 is the 139th psalm of the Book of Psalms, beginning in English in the King James Version: "O Lord, thou hast searched me, and known me". The psalm is a hymn psalm. Attributed to David, it is known for its affirmation of God's omnipresence. Alexander Kirkpatrick states that "the consciousness of the intimate personal relation between God and man which is characteristic of the whole Psalter reaches its climax here".

In the slightly different numbering system used in the Greek Septuagint version of the Bible, and in the Vulgate, this psalm is Psalm 138.

The psalm forms a regular part of Jewish, Catholic, Lutheran, Anglican and other Protestant liturgies. It has often been set to music.

Background and themes
According to the Midrash Shocher Tov, Psalm 139 was written by Adam. Verses 5 and 16, for example, allude to the formation of the First Man. Abramowitz explains that the themes of the psalm relate to Adam, while David wrote the actual words. Psalm 139 is part of the final Davidic collection of psalms, comprising Psalms 138 through 145, which are attributed to David in the first verse.

Verse 16 is the only place in the Tanakh where the word , from the same root as the term golem, appears. In describing the creation of Adam hour by hour, the Talmud states that in the second hour the dust from the earth was gathered into a golem (Sanhedrin 38b). A Midrash on Genesis 5:1 also describes Adam's creation as a golem of immense size, stretching from one end of the earth to the other. This is reflected in verse 16, in which Adam says to God, "Your eyes saw my golem".

The psalm addresses God, or, in Jewish tradition, YHWH, and the speaker calls out and establishes a salutation and an understanding of what they know God to be. The psalmist goes on to marvel at the omnipresence of God even in the most secret of places, and praise God for his vast knowledge of the future. Finally, the psalmist concludes by asking God to "slay the wicked" and stands against them, assuring God of their fervor, asking to be tested and led in the correct path. The psalmist praises God; terms of supreme authority, and being able to witness everything on heaven, earth and in the underworld. Through this psalm, the psalmist insists on God being the only true God and challenges anyone to question their faith.

Text

Hebrew Bible version
Following is the Hebrew text of Psalm 139:

King James Version 
 O Lord, thou hast searched me, and known me.
 Thou knowest my downsitting and mine uprising, thou understandest my thought afar off.
 Thou compassest my path and my lying down, and art acquainted with all my ways.
 For there is not a word in my tongue, but, lo, O Lord, thou knowest it altogether.
 Thou hast beset me behind and before, and laid thine hand upon me.
 Such knowledge is too wonderful for me; it is high, I cannot attain unto it.
 Whither shall I go from thy spirit? or whither shall I flee from thy presence?
 If I ascend up into heaven, thou art there: if I make my bed in hell, behold, thou art there.
 If I take the wings of the morning, and dwell in the uttermost parts of the sea;
 Even there shall thy hand lead me, and thy right hand shall hold me.
 If I say, Surely the darkness shall cover me; even the night shall be light about me.
 Yea, the darkness hideth not from thee; but the night shineth as the day: the darkness and the light are both alike to thee.
 For thou hast possessed my reins: thou hast covered me in my mother's womb.
 I will praise thee; for I am fearfully and wonderfully made: marvellous are thy works; and that my soul knoweth right well.
 My substance was not hid from thee, when I was made in secret, and curiously wrought in the lowest parts of the earth.
 Thine eyes did see my substance, yet being unperfect; and in thy book all my members were written, which in continuance were fashioned, when as yet there was none of them.
 How precious also are thy thoughts unto me, O God! how great is the sum of them!
 If I should count them, they are more in number than the sand: when I awake, I am still with thee.
 Surely thou wilt slay the wicked, O God: depart from me therefore, ye bloody men.
 For they speak against thee wickedly, and thine enemies take thy name in vain.
 Do not I hate them, O Lord, that hate thee? and am not I grieved with those that rise up against thee?
 I hate them with perfect hatred: I count them mine enemies.
 Search me, O God, and know my heart: try me, and know my thoughts:
 And see if there be any wicked way in me, and lead me in the way everlasting.

Use

Judaism 
 Psalm 139 is recited during the week of Parashat Bereishit.
 Verses 8–10 are included in a Tefilat HaDerech (Traveler's Prayer) produced by the Open Siddur Project; similarly, verses 9 and 10 are included in a Reform version of the Traveler's Prayer.

Catholic Church
Since the Middle Ages, this psalm was recited or sung during the Vespers office on Thursday, according to the Rule of St. Benedict, established in 530. The Vespers on Thursday thus had only three psalms instead of four.

In the current Liturgy of the Hours, Psalm 139 is recited at Vespers, but also on Wednesdays of the fourth week of the main four weekly cycle of liturgical prayers. In the liturgy of the Mass, it is played or sung for the Feast of St. John the Baptist.

Other
Psalm 139:13 has been used by both the pro-life and LGBT movements as a blessing and a source of support for their activities. The Ethics and Religious Liberty Commission of the Southern Baptist Convention sponsors the Psalm 139 Project, which aims to place ultrasound machines in crisis pregnancy centers as a means of convincing pregnant women not to abort their unborn child.

Psalm 139 in music 
The hymn , of the genre Neues Geistliches Lied, by Eugen Eckert is based on Psalm 139.

Classical music
  for alto solo, mixed choir and orchestra" by Ernst Pepping
 , cantata by Johann Sebastian Bach for the eighth Sunday after Trinity
 Psalm 139 by William Gillies Whittaker
 Psalm 139 for alto, mixed unison choir and organ by Rudi Spring
 Psalm 139 for mixed choir" by Johann Nepomuk David
 Psalm 139 by James O'Donnell, performed in Westminster Hall after the death of Elizabeth II
 The Wings of the Morning, for medium voice and piano, by David Evan Thomas
 Thou hast searched me and known me by Joanna Marsh

Jazz
 139. Psalm for mezzo-soprano, trumpet, trombone and tuba by Franz Koglmann

Contemporary Christian music
 "139/Dead of Night" from the 2016 album Invisible by Leeland incorporates verses from Psalm 139 as lyrics
 "If I go up" by Eden Burning
 "Fearfully and Wonderfully Made" by Charlotte Martin
 "Ken je mij?" by Trijntje Oosterhuis
"139" by Kings Kaleidoscope 
 "Psalm 139" by Michael W. Smith
 "Psalm 139" by Sarah Reeves
 "Psalm 139 Far Too Wonderful" from the 2015 album Psalms II by Shane & Shane
 "Psalm 139 (You Are There)" by MercyMe
 "There is no moment of my life" by Brian Foley
 "Wings of the Morning" by Capleton and Method Man
 "You Will Be There" by Jeremy Camp
 "Psalm 139" from the 1999 album Skalleluia Too! by The Insyderz
"O God, you search me and you know me" by Bernadette Farrell.
 "Anywhere I Go" by Glad
 "Psalm 139" hidden track from the 1996 album God by Rebecca St. James

In literature
Verses 9-10 feature in the short story Ved det yderste Hav (The uttermost parts of the sea) by Danish writer Hans Christian Andersen.

References

External links

 
 Psalms Chapter 139 text in Hebrew and English, mechon-mamre.org
 Lord, you have probed me, you know me: text and footnotes, usccb.org United States Conference of Catholic Bishops
 Psalm 139:1 introduction and text, biblestudytools.com
 Psalm 139 enduringword.com
Hymnary.org, Hymns for Psalm 139

139
Works attributed to David